A flute is a musical instrument.

Flute can also refer to:

People
 Sébastien Flute (born 1972), French archer

Arts, entertainment, and media
 "Flute" (song), a song by New World Sound and Thomas Newson
 Francis Flute, a Shakespearean character

Other uses
 Flute (cutting tool), the grooves on a drill bit
 Flute (geology), a primary sedimentary structure
 Flute (glacial), a glacial landform
 Flute, the secondary of a two-stage thermonuclear weapon
 Champagne flute, stemware used to drink champagne
 En flûte, a French naval expression of the Age of Sail to designate the use of a warship as a transport with reduced armament
 Flûte (ship), the French spelling of Fluyt, a type of ship 
 Flute Summit (British Columbia), Canada
 Fluted mold, used to fabricate a latex balloon that fills to a spherically shape
 Flûte, a type of baguette bread
 Flute, a type of flue pipe in organs

See also
 Fluting (disambiguation)